Fahedbassel Nazih Bawji (born December 26, 1989) is an American/Lebanese professional basketball player who plays as a power forward/center for Beirut BC of the Lebanese Basketball League.

Junior career
At age 15, Bawji started his international career with the Lebanese Junior National Team. 
In 2006, Bawji travelled to the United States to continue his high school education and compete at the high school level. In 2006, he registered in Cypress Christian school located in Houston TX. The same year Bawji got to win the Texas state championship. The following year Bawji attended Klein Collins High school, where he averaged a double-double (11 pts 12 rebs), which helped him get selected to the Texas All-Star game event, in which he had 14 points and 18 rebounds. In 2009 Bawji got recruited to the University of Tulsa, Oklahoma (NCAA Division 1), which he decided to leave one year later to pursue a professional career overseas. In 2010 Bawji signed a 1-year contract with Mouttahed club (Tripoli). He then renewed his contract for two more years.

Lebanese Basketball League career

Personal life
Bassel Bawji was born in Santa Monica, Los Angeles on December 26, 1989, to parents Nazih Bawji and Sawsan El Sayed. His father Nazih, a former basketball player and captain of Riyadi Club and the Lebanese National team, established the Harlem Basketball Academy (Beirut), the first one in the region. Bassel joined the academy when he was 10 years old.

Player profile
Bawji is a power forward. The main weakness cited in Bawji is his lack of ability in three-point range; he has averaged 26.7% on three-point field goal percentage throughout his first three seasons.

References

1989 births
Living people
American people of Lebanese descent
Basketball players from Los Angeles
Lebanese men's basketball players
Basketball players from Houston
Tulsa Golden Hurricane men's basketball players
Power forwards (basketball)
American men's basketball players
Al Riyadi Club Beirut basketball players
Sportspeople of Lebanese descent